The Museum of Military Medicine, formerly the Army Medical Services Museum (AMS Museum), is located in Keogh Barracks, on Mytchett Place Road, Mytchett, Surrey, England.

History

The museum is based on the "Mytchett Collection", a collection of documents accumulated at the Historical Museum at Keogh Barracks from 1952. The museum moved into its present building in 1981. The collection of the Queen Alexandra's Royal Army Nursing Corps Museum, previously based at the Royal Pavilion, Aldershot, moved to the site in 1994.

The museum changed its name from the Army Medical Services Museum to the Museum of Military Medicine in 2016.

The collection
The museum presently houses the collections of the Royal Army Medical Corps (RAMC) and Queen Alexandra's Royal Army Nursing Corps (QARANC) the Royal Army Veterinary Corps (RAVC) and the Royal Army Dental Corps (RADC). The collections on display include uniforms and insignia, medical, dental and veterinary equipment, ambulances, an ambulance train ward coach and a large medal collection including 23 of the 29 Victoria Crosses awarded to the Army Medical Services. The collection also includes Florence Nightingale's carriage that she used in the Crimea, adapted for carrying stretchers. The museum includes a shop.

Future 
In December 2020, plans were approved for the construction of a new building in Cardiff, into which the museum would relocate.

References

External links

 Museum on the UK MOD website

Museums established in 1952
1952 establishments in England
Regimental museums in England
Museums in Surrey
Nursing museums
Medical museums in England
Military and war museums in England
Royal Army Medical Corps
Surrey Heath